Sailing competition at the 2014 Asian Beach Games was held in Phuket, Thailand from 16 to 20 November 2014 at Karon Beach, Phuket.

Medalists

Men

Women

Open

Medal table

Results

Men

RS:One
16–20 November

RS:X
16–20 November

Optimist
16–20 November

Laser
16–20 November

Women

RS:One
16–20 November

RS:X
16–20 November

Optimist
16–20 November

Laser Radial
16–20 November

Open

Hobie 16
16–20 November

References

External links 
 Official website

2014 Asian Beach Games events
2014
Asian Beach Games events
Sailing competitions in Thailand